The Toyota Yaris WRC is a World Rally Car designed by Toyota Gazoo Racing WRT to compete in the World Rally Championship. The car is based on the Vitz-based XP130 Toyota Yaris, and is the first car Toyota have competed with in the WRC since withdrawing from the championship at the end of the 1999 season to focus on their Le Mans Prototype and Formula One programmes. The car was driven by Sébastien Ogier, Elfyn Evans, Ott Tänak, Kalle Rovanperä and Takamoto Katsuta.

The car entered its testing and development phase in March 2014, ahead of its début in the 2017 season. Development and operation of the cars would be overseen by four-time World Drivers' Champion Tommi Mäkinen, and entered under the banner of Toyota Gazoo Racing WRT. The car made its first public appearance in May 2016 during testing in Palokka-Puuppola, with Mäkinen and Juho Hänninen driving. The Toyota Gazoo Racing three car team of Toyota Yaris WRCs won the 2018 manufacturers' championship, followed in 2019 by the team's Ott Tänak and Martin Järveoja winning the 2019 drivers' and co-drivers' championships, the 2020 drivers' (Ogier) and co-drivers' (Julien Ingrassia) championships, and a sweep of the 2021 manufacturers', drivers' (Ogier) and co-drivers' (Ingrassia) championships.

A successor known as the Toyota GR Yaris WRC, based on the 2020 GR Yaris road car, was due to be introduced in 2021 but was later decided against in favour of sticking with the existing rally car.

World Rally Championship results

Championship titles

WRC victories

WRC results

* Season still in progress.

See also
 World Rally Car
 Citroën DS3 WRC
 Citroën C3 WRC
 Ford Fiesta RS WRC
 Ford Fiesta WRC
 Hyundai i20 WRC
 Hyundai i20 Coupe WRC
 Mini John Cooper Works WRC
 Volkswagen Polo R WRC

References

External links

Technical details at wrc.com 
Yaris WRC at juwra.com
Toyota Yaris WRC at ewrc-results.com

World Rally Cars
Yaris WRC
All-wheel-drive vehicles
World Rally championship-winning cars